The Croatian Party of Rights ( or HSP) is the name of a contemporary Croatian conservative political party which was founded in 1990 after the introduction of multi-party democracy in the country. It claims lineage to the historical party of the same name which was active between 1861 and 1929 and which advocated the right to self-determination at the time when Croatia was part of Austria-Hungary and Kingdom of Yugoslavia.

There were other briefly active splinter parties with the same name in the early 20th century which often changed forms and merged with each other but were eventually all disbanded by 1929. Since the early 1990s and the foundation of the contemporary party a number of right-wing factions have also splintered from it or formed nationalist parties independently, using the name in some form, as they all claim to be the "true" adherents to the ideology of the original 19th-century party. In Croatia the name is usually taken to refer to either the historical party or the 1990 party as it is the only party to date carrying that name which managed to win seats in the Croatian Parliament. Smaller parties carrying the name generally receive marginal coverage in the local media even though they regularly run in both local and general elections.

In addition, some of these parties also operate similarly named branches in Bosnia and Herzegovina, usually on a nationalist platform promoting interests of Bosnian Croats and regularly running in the Bosnian general elections. Note that the native name of all these parties contains the word prava which is the both singular and plural genitive form of the word pravo (which in English means "right" - as in the "right to self-determination"). Because of this the name is regarded as a singular in Croatia (literally "Croatian Party of Right"), but commonly appears in English in the plural form, probably to distinguish it from the English term "Right" which is generally used for right-wing ideology. Nevertheless, both historical and contemporary parties carrying the name are considered representatives of the conservative, nationalist, or even far-right side of the political spectrum.

The name may thus refer to:

Historical parties
Party of Rights (1861–1929) (Stranka prava or SP), influential historical party led by Ante Starčević
Pure Party of Rights (1895) (Čista stranka prava or ČSP), splinter party formed in 1895 which merged back into the original party in 1902 
Pure Party of Rights (1905) (Čista stranka prava or ČSP), renewed splinter party which was founded in 1905
Starčević's Party of Rights (Starčevićeva stranka prava), splinter party formed in 1909 by members of the Pure Party of Rights

Modern parties in Croatia
Croatian Party of Rights (Hrvatska stranka prava or HSP), right-wing populist political party established in 1990, has one seat in the parliament as of 2010
Croatian Party of Rights 1861 (Hrvatska stranka prava 1861 or HSP 1861), splinter party formed in 1995 and led by Dobroslav Paraga
Croatian Party of Rights Dr. Ante Starčević (Hrvatska stranka prava dr. Ante Starčević or HSP-AS), splinter party formed in 2009 and led by Hrvoje Niče
Croatian Pure Party of Rights (Hrvatska čista stranka prava or HČSP), party formed in 1992 claiming ideological lineage to the 1905 splinter party
Autochthonous Croatian Party of Rights (Autohtona hrvatska stranka prava or A-HSP), far-right party founded in 2005

Modern parties in Bosnia and Herzegovina
Croatian Party of Rights of Bosnia and Herzegovina (Hrvatska stranka prava Bosne i Hercegovine or HSP BiH), HSP branch in Bosnia and Herzegovina
Croatian Party of Rights Dr. Ante Starčević of Bosnia and Herzegovina (Hrvatska stranka prava dr. Ante Starčević Bosne i Hercegovine or HSP AS), HSP AS branch in Bosnia and Herzegovina